Anne Meson (born 12 May 1975) is a French show host and singer. Her mother Anne was a Russian artist and a dance teacher. Her father José was a Spanish acrobat y bailarín principal del molino rojo de Paris. In her childhood, Meson studied piano, dance but also horse riding.

Her TV careers began in 1982 at 7, when she appears in several commercials. She also was a child model.

Meson appeared for the first time on the silver screen in 1984, in Stress along with French actors Carole Laure and Guy Marchand. Later, she joined the casts of : L'amour ou presque (1985), La lettre perdue (1987) and Bernadette (1988).

In addition to her cinema career, Meson also appeared on stage. She played in Molière's Le malade imaginaire, and starred in Philippe Chatel's famous musical Emilie Jolie. Two years later, Meson played as an accompanist to French rock-star Johnny Hallyday during one of his concerts in Paris-Bercy.

The Disney era 
In 1989, Meson became the new French Disney Ambassador, succeeding to Douchka.

Her singing career began with the hit Oliver, inspired from Disney's Oliver and Company (1988). Her first solo album was released a few month later. In the meantime, her TV careers took a step forward as she co presented the Disney Parade French show with French presenter Jean-Pierre Foucault.

From this moment on, her career bore the "Disney" seal : As the French Disney Ambassador, she made the front page of several "Disney" magazines, recorded stories on K7. She performed the French version of several Disney animated series, like Chip 'n Dale Rescue Rangers (released in France under the title Tic et Tac, les rangers du risque) and Darkwing Duck (released in France under the title Myster Mask). Meson also worked at the French radio station RTL where she appears in two programs: RTL en scène and Quoi de neuf chez Disney. She also appeared in the French version of the musical Annie playing Tessie, one of the orphans before taking on the title role Annie.

Meanwhile, three of the four first album's singles made it to the top ranks of the French Charts, and two years later saw Meson's consecration, as she was among the nominees for the 1991 "Victoire de la Musique – Album pour enfants de l'année" (Best Album for Children of the Year) for her first album. At the same time, her new LP, entitled "Demain c'est aujourd'hui" (Tomorrow is Today) is released. "Demain c'est aujourd'hui" contents several tracks entirely independent from the "Disney" movies and characters, like "1.2.3 Soleil" or "Mais qu'est-ce qui m'arrive ?". Meson also took part in a single designed to save a dying radio station for children "Superloustic".

In 1992, Meson was back to the French stage of the Olympia where she performed live tracks taken from her two first albums. The same year, her third album was released. Christened Que fera la belle? (a reference to Disney's Beauty and the Beast (1991)) had rather few "Disney" songs. Her second album was nominated for the Victoire de la Musique (Best album for Children of the Year). That year, Meson sits her Baccalauréat, as she prepares her last Disney album, "Mon plus beau rêve" (My dearest dream).

At the end of her Disney engagement in 1994, Meson left the Disney label.

American career 
The following year, Meson got a show on her own on French TV, before leaving to the United States, where she entered the Theatre of Art. Her American career included dubbing movies and commercials, the writing of her first play Alfredo's way. She came back to France to dance in Maurice Béjart's 1789 et nous, during the anniversary of the French Revolution. She also joined the Notre-Dame de Paris B cast in Las Vegas. This cast recorded an album, in which she sings these three songs : So look no more for love, Shining like the sun and My heart if you will swear.

She was selected for the new Notre-Dame de Paris French cast, in which she sometimes played Esméralda's and Fleur-de-lys' parts. She also recorded a demo for Randall Wallace's film The Man in the Iron Mask and a chorus part on a track in Garou's solo debut album Seul.

Meson moved to Spain where she currently lives with her boyfriend. She has not given up singing, as she's a member of Spanish band Naughty noise.

Discographie

Albums 
1990: Anne
1991: Demain c'est aujourd'hui
1992: Anne au pays d'EuroDisney
1992: Que fera la belle
1993: A toi de chanter volume 1 et 2
1993: Mon plus beau rêve
1994: Ses plus belles chansons
2000: Notre Dame de Paris Las Vegas cast B
2000: Garou – Seul (Choeurs sur "Criminel")
2000: Naughty noise – New bauhaus
2002: Naugthy noise – Mind your head

Singles 
1987: Comme le dit toujours mon père (chorus)
1989: Oliver
1990: Si ma vie tourne bien
1990: La petite sirène
1990: Les p'tits loups
1990: Anne
1991: Bernard et Bianca au pays des kangourous
1991: 1,2,3 soleil
1991: Demain c'est aujourd'hui (special edition)
1991: Superloustic – Ta radio c'est ton droit (participation)
1991: Demain c'est aujourd'hui
1992: Anne au pays d'EuroDisney
1992: Que fera la belle
1992: Comme Bambi
1992: Dans le bleu
1993: Mon plus beau rêve
1993: Tout le monde veut devenir un cat
1993: A toi de chanter volume 1 et 2
1993: Mon plus beau rêve
1994: Ses plus belles chansons

Filmographie 
1984: Stress de Jean-Louis Bertucelli
1985: L'amour ou presque de Jean-François Balme
1987: La lettre perdue de Jean-Louis Bertucelli
1988: Bernadette de Jean Delannoy

French children's musicians
French people of Russian descent
French people of Spanish descent
1975 births
Living people
21st-century French singers
21st-century French women singers